Franceschini may refer to:

Alberto Franceschini (born 26 October 1947), Italian former terrorist, a co-founder of the Red Brigades
Alfredo De Franceschini (1902–1959), Italian professional midfielder football player, and football manager
Amy Franceschini (born 1970), American artist and designer 
Baldassare Franceschini (1611–1689), was a late Baroque painter active mainly around Florence
Bob Franceschini (born 1961), American jazz saxophonist, songwriter, and arranger
Daniele Franceschini (born 1976), Italian football midfielder.
Dario Franceschini (born 1958), Italian politician
Ezio Franceschini (1906-1983), Italian professor of medieval literature, Latin scholar and philologist
Fabio Franceschini (born 1988) Italian footballer
Giacomo Franceschini (1672–1745), Italian painter
Ivan Franceschini (born 1976), Italian football (soccer) defender who currently plays for Torino of Italy's Serie A.
Livio Franceschini (born 1913), Italian basketball player who competed in the 1936 Summer Olympics. 
Marcantonio Franceschini (1648–1729), Italian painter of the Baroque period, active mostly in his native Bologna.
Petronio Franceschini (c. 1650–1680), Baroque music composer from Bologna
Ruggero Franceschini (born 1939), Italian Catholic archbishop of Smyrna and apostolic administrator of the Vicariate of Anatolia

See also
Franceschi

Italian-language surnames
Surnames of Italian origin
Patronymic surnames
Surnames from given names